The Miami Valley is the land area surrounding the Great Miami River in southwest Ohio, USA, and includes the Little Miami, Mad, and Stillwater rivers as well. Geographically, it includes Dayton, Springfield, Middletown, Hamilton, and other communities. The name is derived from the Miami Indians.

Commonly, however, it refers to the economic and cultural-social region centered on the Greater Dayton area . Middletown and Hamilton both fall under the economic and cultural-social influence of Cincinnati and thus are not commonly included in this sense. Institutions and enterprises in the Dayton area, such as Miami Valley Career Technology Center, Miami Valley Hospital, Miami Valley Young Marines, Miami Valley Council of the Boy Scouts of America and Miami Valley Storytellers illustrate local usage.

History
During the mid-twentieth century, among the largest employers in the Valley were Procter & Gamble in Cincinnati, Champion Paper and Fiber in Hamilton, Armco in Middletown, and National Cash Register in Dayton.

Counties and cities
Local television stations WDTN, ThinkTV (WPTD and WPTO), WHIO-TV, WKEF and WRGT include the following counties and cities in the cultural Miami Valley:
Montgomery County (Dayton)
Greene County (Xenia)
Preble County (Eaton)
Clark County (Springfield)
Miami County (Troy)
Darke County (Greenville)
Champaign County (Urbana)
Shelby County (Sidney)
Logan County (Bellefontaine)
Butler and Warren counties (Middletown)
Wayne County, Indiana (Richmond)
Mercer County (Celina)
Auglaize County (Wapakoneta)

Additionally, WHIO includes the following locations in its news and weather coverage:
Clinton County (Wilmington)
Union County, Indiana (Liberty)
Randolph County, Indiana (Winchester)

Major highways
Interstate 75 - Runs north to south along the valley and through downtown Dayton.
Interstate 70 - Traverses the valley from east to west.
Interstate 71 - Runs north to south along the eastern half of the Miami Valley.
Interstate 675 - Bypasses Dayton from I-75 south of the city to I-70 east of it.
U.S. Route 35 - Runs east to west through the Dayton metro area.
U.S. Route 68 - Runs north to south through farmlands in the eastern Miami Valley.
U.S. Route 127 - Runs north to south through several cities and rural communities in the western Miami Valley.
Ohio State Route 129 - Connects Hamilton to I-75.
Ohio State Route 49 - Forms a bypass west of Dayton and continues north into Darke County.

Demographics

As Greater Cincinnati grows northward through Butler County, it could conceivably merge with Greater Dayton by 2030, thereby virtually erasing any boundary between the two current Combined Statistical Areas (CSA). As a result, the US Census Bureau could begin reporting the Cincinnati and Dayton metropolitan areas as one by that time, though it would be up to the U.S. Office of Management and Budget to make the merger decision. The new Cincinnati–Dayton metropolitan area would be comparable in size to that of the Orlando–Deltona–Daytona Beach, FL CSA and place it within the top 20 most populous metros in the US, with a population of nearly 3.0 million.

See also
 Dayton metropolitan area

References

Further reading
 Sealander, Judith. Grand Plans: Business Progressivism and Social Change in Ohio's Miami Valley, 1890-1929 (1988) excerpt

Regions of Ohio
Valleys of Ohio
Landforms of Montgomery County, Ohio 
Landforms of Greene County, Ohio 
Landforms of Preble County, Ohio 
Landforms of Clark County, Ohio 
Landforms of Miami County, Ohio
Landforms of Darke County, Ohio 
Landforms of Champaign County, Ohio
Landforms of Shelby County, Ohio 
Landforms of Logan County, Ohio
Landforms of Butler County, Ohio
Landforms of Warren County, Ohio 
Landforms of Wayne County, Indiana